GoGo Penguin is the eponymous fifth studio album by English band GoGo Penguin. It was released on 5 June 2020 under Blue Note Records.

Critical reception
GoGo Penguin was met with "universal acclaim" reviews from critics. At Metacritic, which assigns a weighted average rating out of 100 to reviews from mainstream publications, this release received an average score of 81, based on 5 reviews.

Track listing

Personnel
 Chris Illingworth - artwork, piano
 Nick Blacka - bass
 Rob Turner - drums
 Norman NItzsche - mastering
 Joseph Reiser - engineer, mixer, producer
 Brendan Williams - engineer, mixer, producer

Charts

References

2020 albums
GoGo Penguin albums
Blue Note Records albums